Mujiv Sabbihi Hataman (born September 11, 1972) is a Filipino indigenous people's rights advocate and politician from the indigenous Yakan people of the Sulu Archipelago. He became nationally prominent when he served as the sixth and last regional governor of the Autonomous Region in Muslim Mindanao from 2011 until it was replaced by the Bangsamoro Autonomous Region in Muslim Mindanao (BARMM) in 2019.

Since 2019, he has been serving as the representative of Basilan's lone district and concurrently as a House Deputy Speaker. On July 10, 2020, he was one of the 11 representatives who voted to grant the franchise renewal of ABS-CBN. Hataman also previously served as the Party-list Representative of Anak Mindanao from 2001 to 2010.

Early life and education
Hataman was born on September 11, 1972 in Buli-Buli, Sumisip, Basilan. He came from an influential family. His grandfather is the Panglima or leader of Yakan in Sumisip while his father was the barangay captain of Sumisip when it was still a barangay. He completed his primary studies at Buli-Buli Elementary School in Sumisip in March 1986 and secondary studies at Basilan National High School in 1990. He graduated with a degree in Computer Engineering at AMA Computer College (now AMA Computer University), where he was the leader of the Muslim Youth and Students Alliance.

Early political career

Relationship with Wahab Akbar 

Hataman started as an ally of former Basilan governor Wahab Akbar; he served as Akbar's chief of staff while he was Governor, and in 2001 was supported as the main party-list Anak-Mindanao candidate to the House of Representatives.  Under the party-list system, an underrepresented group or party can obtain one House seat for every two percent that it gets of the party-list votes, with a maximum of three.  AMIN achieved the minimum threshold despite election irregularities that nullified some of its votes, but the Supreme Court then issued a temporary restraining order that prevented the party-list representatives from being sworn in.  Mujiv served as spokesperson for AMIN in the intervening period.  After a two-year delay, the Supreme Court in July 2003 lifted the order and he was finally installed as a representative from Basilan at age 30.

Being a human rights advocate, Hataman opposed Gov, Akabar's implementation of indiscriminate warrantless arrests in Basilan. This started the disagreement between the two. This angered Gov. Akbar that ultimately lead to the falling out of the two.

Accusations in Akbar assassination

Captured suspect and former Tuburan town mayor Hajuron Jamiri accused both Mujiv and his brother Jim as being the masterminds of the November 2007 bombing at the House of Representatives that killed four people including Wahab Akbar. Jamiri claimed in a two-page affidavit that Mujiv and Jim wanted Akbar dead because Basilan would "not be at peace" under his administration.

The Hataman brothers denied the allegations, however, and Jimiri's statement was eventually retracted.  Mujiv claimed that Jimiri had been tortured and that his "confession" came under duress.  Fellow conspirator Ikram Indama likewise later claimed that Salapudin, Bayan Judda, Caidar Aunal, Adham Kusain, Jang Hataman, Jim Hataman and Mujiv Hataman were all not involved in the Batasan blast, and that he was forced by the Akbars to admit to the bombing and to implicate the others.

Regional Governor of the Autonomous Region in Muslim Mindanao

Officer-In-Charge of ARMM
On  December 22, 2011, due to the "Reform Programs" of President Benigno Aquino III Congressman Hataman was appointed as Officer-In-Charge of the Autonomous Region in Muslim Mindanao. The move was criticized by many as Hataman was not a member of the Regional Legislative Assembly. Under Republic Act No. 10153, the President has given authority to appoint Officers In Charge while the Regional Election, originally scheduled August 8, 2011 was postponed until the general election on May 12, 2013.

Full term as ARMM Governor
During his assumption as OIC-Regional Governor, Hataman announce that he will not run as Regional Governor to focus on his reform programs. But months before the filing of candidacy for 2013 election he was convinced by many cause oriented groups in Mindanao to pursue for a new mandate.

Finally, after being convinced by different Civil Society groups Hataman ran for Regional Governor of ARMM, with DILG-ARMM Regional Secretary Al-Rasheed "Momoy" Lucman as his running mate.

He ran under the administration Liberal Party against former Regional Governor Nur Misuari, Sultan Kudarat Governor Pax Mungudadatu and 3 other independent candidates. He won in a landslide victory with 232,253 votes

When the ARMM was abolished and the Bangsamoro Autonomous Region established in its place, the Bangsamoro Transition Authority (BTA) was instituted as an interim regional government body. As per law, Hataman as Regional Governor of the ARMM at the time of the region's abolishment automatically becomes a member of the BTA but opted against joining the interim body so he could focus on pursuing local humanitarian and security programs in his home province of Basilan.

Cabinet

House of Representatives 
Since 2019, Hataman has been serving as the representative of Basilan's lone district. He served as a House Deputy Speaker from 2019 until 2022. In 2022, he joined the minority bloc and was named as a deputy minority leader.

Notable house votes 
On July 10, 2020, he was one of the 11 representatives who voted to grant the franchise renewal of ABS-CBN.

Human rights advocacy
Mujiv served as a program coordinator of the Kahapan Foundation—Moro Human Rights Center (Kahapan-MHRC). When he was elected to Congress, he sponsored the Anti-Discrimination Bill, which affirmed the International Convention against All form of Racial Discrimination.

Wealth
In a 2004 Philippine Daily Inquirer report, Mujiv was cited as one of the "poorest" congressmen serving in the House of Representatives, with a net worth of only P420,000.  The same report noted that out of 225 members of the House, only six were not millionaires, with the richest worth upward of P500 million.  By 2006 Mujiv's net worth had increased to P690,000, but was still in the bottom tenth.

Family business involvement
According to a BusinessWorld article, Hataman in 2004 started a company with his brother that distributes fresh fish from Mindanao to businesses in Manila.  He said the business is not his, but that of his brother and a brother-in-law, and he only shares his managerial and marketing expertise.
"I only help in the marketing. It's really my brother who runs the business," he said.  The business started with only P20,000 in capital and now earns P30,000-P40,000 a month.  His distribution network includes wet markets in Manila and Quezon City.

Hataman political bloc

The Hatamans and their allies constitute one of the powerful familial political blocs of Basilan, and frequently come in conflict with the Akbar family in competing for elected office.  Frequently this conflict turns violent; in December 2008, two of Mujiv's cousins were shot dead in an attack, and Mujiv was one of several politicians accused in Akbar's assassination in November 2007.

His two brothers are also influential politicians; older brother Hadjiman "Jim" Hataman was the former representative from the lone district of Basilan, and younger brother "Boy" Hataman was previously mayor of Sumisip. Together, the Hataman brothers constitute a powerful political bloc in Basilan.  Former Lamitan mayor, Roderick Furigay is considered one of their allies.  Gerry Salapuddin was also an ally, but they may have had a falling out after the accusations associated with the Akbar assassination.

Personal life
Hataman is from the Yakan tribe. He is married to Sitti Djalia Turabin.

On August 1, 2020, Hataman and his wife announced that they have contracted COVID-19.

References

1972 births
Filipino Muslims
Governors of the Autonomous Region in Muslim Mindanao
Lakas–CMD politicians
Living people
People from Basilan
Members of the House of Representatives of the Philippines from Basilan
Party-list members of the House of Representatives of the Philippines